"Let There Be Cowgirls" is a song co-written and recorded by American country music artist Chris Cagle.  It was released in July 2012 as the second single from his album Back in the Saddle.  The song was written by Cagle and Kim Tribble.

Background
Cagle said, "This is a ‘Tah-Dah!’ song; we got lucky, it wrote itself, I’m surrounded by beauty at the ranch and ‘my cowgirls’ are part of the art; I have a genuine appreciation. ‘Cowgirls’ is already a fan favorite at our shows." Cagle said the song is inspired by his wife Kay.

Critical reception
Ben Foster of Country Universe gave the album a C rating and described as "“Got My Country On,” Part 2". Allen Jacobs of Roughstock wrote, "It suits Cagle's masculine persona as well as his bigger rockin' hits have and with radio and fans reminded of who he is, it has the road laid-out for at least another Top 20, perhaps Top 10 success. Daryl Addison of GAC wrote the song "features some superbly swamp-filled resonator and B-3 organ to round out the hard-country production."

Chart performance
"Let There Be Cowgirls" debuted at number 56 on the U.S. Billboard Hot Country Songs chart for the week of July 14, 2012. It also debuted at number 97 on the U.S. Billboard Hot 100 chart for the week of February 9, 2013.

Year-end charts

References

Songs about cowboys and cowgirls
2012 singles
2012 songs
Chris Cagle songs
Bigger Picture Music Group singles
Songs written by Chris Cagle
Song recordings produced by Keith Stegall
Songs written by Kim Tribble